The enzyme acetoxybutynylbithiophene deacetylase (EC 3.1.1.54) catalyzes the reaction 

5-(4-acetoxybut-1-ynyl)-2,2′-bithiophene + H2O  5-(4-hydroxybut-1-ynyl)-2,2′-bithiophene + acetate

This enzyme belongs to the family of hydrolases, specifically those acting on carboxylic ester bonds.  The systematic name is 5-(4-acetoxybut-1-ynyl)-2,2′-bithiophene O-acetylhydrolase. Other names in common use include acetoxybutynylbithiophene esterase, and 5-(4-acetoxy-1-butynyl)-2,2′-bithiophene:acetate esterase.

References

 

EC 3.1.1
Enzymes of unknown structure